Dichagyris multicuspis is a moth of the family Noctuidae. It is found southern Urals, Armenia, central Asia, Turkestan, the Tien-Shan Mountains, Korla, Turkey, Afghanistan, western China and Mongolia.

The wingspan is about 37 mm.

Subspecies
Dichagyris multicuspis multicuspis
Dichagyris multicuspis aequicuspis

External links
Fauna Europaea

multicuspis
Moths described in 1852